Hyrum Conrad Pope (December 2, 1880 – August 24, 1939) was a German-born architect with important architectural works throughout the  western United States and Canada.  Pope was born in Fürth, Bavaria and immigrated to the United States as a teenager.  He went to school at the Art Institute of Chicago where he was influenced in the Prairie School architectural style. In 1910, he opened an architectural firm with Harold W. Burton (Pope & Burton) in Salt Lake City, Utah.  Pope designed a variety of places of worship for many faiths, civic buildings and homes, some of which are listed on the National Register of Historic Places.

Temple architecture
As young architects, Pope & Burton won design competitions for two of their most well-known works, the Cardston Alberta and Laie Hawaii temples for the Church of Jesus Christ of Latter-day Saints (LDS Church).  Later on he became Chairman of the Board of Temple Architects for the church and oversaw the design and construction of the Idaho Falls Idaho and Los Angeles California temples.  At the dedication proceedings of the Cardston Alberta Temple, Pope remarked that temple architecture "should be ancient as well as modern.  It should express all the power which we associate with God."

Personal life
Pope married Eliza Rutishauser. His son Theodore Pope also became an architect.  Pope died unexpectedly of an apparent heart attack in Preston, Idaho in 1939 while inspecting the construction of the Franklin County Courthouse.

Notable Works

Other existing works
Malcolm and Elizabeth Keyser House (1913), NRHP-listed
Julia Budge Nibley House (1914)
Walter Scott Weiler House (1914)
St. Paul's Episcopal Church - Salt Lake City (1917)
Brooklyn Chapel Meetinghouse (1917).  Currently the Evening Star Baptist Church on Franklin and Gates
Denver First Ward Meetinghouse (1918)
Vernal Second Ward Chapel (1918)
Centerville Ward Chapel (1918)
Highland Park Ward Meetinghouse (1924). Designed by Burton & Pope.  NRHP-listed in Highland Park Historic District (Salt Lake City, Utah)
Ezra Thompson Building (1924).  Also known as the former Salt Lake Tribune building)
Tribune Building (Salt Lake City, Utah) (1924), by Pope & Burton, NRHP-listed
Memorial House Facade (1926), in Memory Grove (Salt Lake City)
Provo First Ward Meetinghouse (1926)
Phoenix Second Ward Meetinghouse, NRHP-listed in Roosevelt Historic District
University Ward Chapel (1929), NRHP-listed in University Neighborhood Historic District (Salt Lake City, Utah)
LeConte Stewart House, Kaysville, Utah, NRHP-listed
Franklin County Courthouse, Preston, Idaho, NRHP-listed

Demolished works
Emigration Ward Chapel (1910-)
Liberty Stake 1st Ward Meetinghouse (1911-1976)
Park Stake First Ward Meetinghouse (1913-1976), previously NRHP-listed 
Nephi First and Second Ward Chapel (1915)
Hyde Park Ward Chapel (1918)

References

1880 births
1939 deaths
20th-century American architects
German emigrants to the United States
German Latter Day Saints
Architects of Latter Day Saint religious buildings and structures
Architects from Utah
School of the Art Institute of Chicago alumni